Holly Oak is an unincorporated town in New Castle County, Delaware, United States. Holly Oak is located northwest of U.S. Route 13 Business between Silverside Road and Harvey Road to the northeast of Wilmington and southwest of Claymont. It was once served by the Philadelphia, Wilmington and Baltimore Railroad. Perkins Run, a Delaware River tributary, mouths at Holly Oak.

See also
Holly Oak gorget

References

External links

Unincorporated communities in New Castle County, Delaware
Unincorporated communities in Delaware